Potassium diplatinum(II) tetrakispyrophosphite  (abbreviated as [Pt2(pop)4]4−)  is the inorganic compound with the formula K4[Pt2(HO2POPO2H)4].  It is a water-soluble yellow salt.  The compound has a long-lived, strongly luminescent excited state, with an emission maximum at ∼510 nm and a lifetime near 10 μs.

Synthesis and reactions
The complex is prepared by heating a mixture of potassium tetrachloroplatinate and phosphorous acid:
2K2PtCl4  +  8H3PO3  →  K4[Pt2(HO2POPO2H)4]  +  8HCl  +  4H2O
Several quat salt derivatives are known.

The anion reacts with boron trifluoride to give the BF2-capped complex [Pt2(P2PO5)4(BF2)8]4-. 

The compound reacts with halogens to give Pt(III) dimers:
K4[Pt2(HO2POPO2H)4  +  Cl2  →   K4[Pt2(HO2POPO2H)4Cl2]

With substoichiometric halogen, linear chain compounds result.

Structure
The pair of square-planar platinum(II) centers are bridged by four pyrophosphito (HO(O)POP(O)OH2-) ligands.   The ligands interact via hydrogen bonds between the POH and P=O group.  The Pt---Pt separation is 293 pm for the dihydrate. In the Pt(III) dichloride, the Pt-Pt distance is 270 pm, indicating Pt-Pt bonding.

References

Platinum(II) compounds
Potassium compounds